Charles Halleck Student Center is a historic institutional building located on the campus of Saint Joseph's College in  Marion Township, Jasper County, Indiana.  The International Style building was built in 1962, and is a multi-story, diamond-shaped building constructed around central dining halls.  It features a wide overhanging roof and concrete trim, stepped terraces, open floating staircases, and large expanses of glass.  It was named for Charles Halleck (1900-1986), a long-time member of the United States House of Representatives.

It was listed on the National Register of Historic Places in 2016.

References

Saint Joseph's College (Indiana)
University and college buildings on the National Register of Historic Places in Indiana
Modernist architecture in Indiana
University and college buildings completed in 1962
Buildings and structures in Jasper County, Indiana
National Register of Historic Places in Jasper County, Indiana